Garrettford station is a SEPTA Route 102 trolley stop in Drexel Hill, Pennsylvania. It is officially located at Edmonds Avenue and Garrett Road, however, the actual location is at the intersection of Edmonds Avenue, Jones Street and Mill Lane, which is south of Garrett Road. The trolley line crosses the aforementioned intersection at the southwest corner of Edmonds Avenue and Jones Street, to the northeast corner of Edmonds Avenue and Mill Lane.

Trolleys arriving at this station travel between 69th Street Terminal in Upper Darby, Pennsylvania and Sharon Hill, Pennsylvania. Garrettford is the first/last stop along the Route 102 line that doesn't share a right-of-way with the Route 101 line to Media, Pennsylvania. The station has a shed with a roof where people can go inside when it is raining. This shed is located on the southwest corner of Edmonds Avenue & Jones Street along the east side of the tracks. An abandoned parking lot exists at the southeast corner of Edmonds Avenue & Garrett Road along the west side of the tracks.

Station layout

External links

 Station from Edmonds Avenue from Google Maps Street View

SEPTA Media–Sharon Hill Line stations